is a video game compilation developed by Sonic Team and published by Sega in 2002 for the GameCube. It is a compilation of several Sonic the Hedgehog games originally released for the Genesis, along with a few other Sega-published titles for the system.

According to the director, Yojiro Ogawa, the purpose of the compilation was to introduce younger players to the original games in the Sonic series. The games are played through a Genesis emulator developed by Sonic Team themselves. Outside of the games, the compilation includes Sonic-themed videos and illustrations, as well as high-resolution scans of the instruction manuals and Sonic the Hedgehog comic covers.

Sonic Mega Collection received positive critical reception, being recommended for its large library of titles, high quality emulation, and its cheap market price. The compilation was re-released for the PlayStation 2, Xbox, and Microsoft Windows as Sonic Mega Collection Plus with additional Sonic games originally released for the Game Gear. This was followed by a new compilation for the PlayStation 2 and GameCube, Sonic Gems Collection, with more obscure and rare Sonic games such as Sonic CD.

Overview
Sonic Mega Collection compiles 14 emulated games originally released for the Sega Genesis, limited to only 12 in releases outside of Japan. In addition to the seven default games, three unlockable games are included that recreate the Sonic & Knuckles "lock-on technology" to allow for new modes and/or playable characters in the first three Sonic games. Four non-Sonic games published by Sega are also unlockable, two of which are exclusive to the Japanese release.  High-resolution instruction manual scans are included for each game. An "Extras" section features over 100 scans of comic covers from Archie Comics' Sonic the Hedgehog series, illustrations of Sonic characters throughout the franchise's history, and a handful of videos promoting other Sonic games, including the opening and ending cutscenes from Sonic CD. 

Sonic Mega Collection Plus includes all 14 of the games from the original release in all regions, plus the addition of six Sega Game Gear games. The compilation's user interface has been updated, and all games now support the ability to suspend and resume gameplay at any time. The illustration gallery has been expanded with artwork from games released since the original Mega Collection, while all videos from the original release have been omitted, replaced by a gallery of storyboards and in-production renders of cutscenes from Sonic Heroes.

Development
Mega Collection was developed by Sonic Team, the studio behind most games in the Sonic series. According to director Yojiro Ogawa, Sonic Team's goal with the compilation was to introduce children to older games in the series and showcase what made Sonic successful. Sonic Team chose to focus on including all the Genesis Sonic games. Rather than porting them from the Genesis, they collaborated with VR-1 Japan to develop an emulator to run the games' ROM images. Series co-creator Yuji Naka, who served as producer, said the team intended to include the 1993 Sega CD game Sonic CD, but storage constraints prevented this. Sonic Team also considered including BlueSky Software's Vectorman (1995). CD and Vectorman later appeared in Sonic Gems Collection (2005), a successor to Mega Collection focusing on rare Sonic games. Sonic Team had trouble gathering materials for the compilation because it had been a decade since they made the games and "Sega's not that good about keeping history." For instance, Naka wanted to include the original prototype of the first game but Sonic Team could not find its ROM image.

Sega announced Mega Collection as a GameCube exclusive in early July 2002, and revealed which games would be included later that month. The compilation went gold the following November; Naka said Sonic Team felt a sense of accomplishment when they completed it. Mega Collection was released in North America on November 10, 2002, in Japan on December 19, 2002, and in Europe on March 21, 2003. In European territories, Infogrames distributed the compilation. When Sega began to expand support for the PlayStation 2, it commissioned a version of Mega Collection for that console and the Xbox. This version, Sonic Mega Collection Plus, was announced at E3 2004. Plus was released in North America on November 2, 2004, in Japan on December 9, 2004, and in Europe on February 4, 2005. A Windows version was released in March 2006, and was later included in the Sonic PC Collection (2009).

Reception

Reviews for Sonic Mega Collection were generally favorable. Louis Bedigian of GameZone praised the controls as "top-notch" including that "even the thumbstick is usable, and it works flawlessly." Game Informer declared Sonic Mega Collection to be "perhaps the best compilation ever." Fran Mirabella of IGN christened the compilation as "a wonderful little collection that, while not perfect, is a great value." Jeff Gerstmann of GameSpot suggested that "if you're fiending for Sonic the Hedgehog and either don't have or are unwilling to drag out a dusty Genesis from the closet, don't hesitate to give it a shot." However, Johnny Liu of Game Revolution advised "just blow the dust off the old Genesis, because there isn't enough good extra stuff here." Nintendo Power described Sonic Mega Collection as "the ultimate compilation of Sonic adventures." It was a runner-up for GameSpots annual "Best Platformer on GameCube" award, which went to Super Mario Sunshine.

Reviews for Sonic Mega Collection Plus were also positive. Chris Baker of GameSpy decided that "despite its exclusions, though, Collection's large selection of titles for $19.99 is a tough thing not to recommend to anyone who calls himself a gamer. Even if a few of the games undeniably suck." Hilary Goldstein of IGN declared that "you can't find a better deal than 20 games for 20 dollars," and that "while not every Sonic game is a winner, the majority are. These games, though old, are superior to Sega's more recent 3D Sonic offerings." Aceinet of GameZone, while praising the compilation overall as "a nearly complete package of classic Sonic games," was critical of the emulation of the Game Gear games, saying that "while the emulation is spot-on for the games, having to put up with a black bar around the screen could be upsetting to some." Jeremy Parish of 1UP.com assured readers that "even with its shortcomings, it's still one of the most value-packed classic compilations available for any system -- as long as you like Sonic." Game Informer suggested that "if you grew up with these games, they're still a joy to play," and that "new converts to the Sonic fold will get a great introduction to the 'hog's history." GMR Magazine concluded that "if you're new to Sonic, for 20 bucks you really can't go wrong."

The PlayStation 2 version of Mega Collection Plus received a "Platinum" sales award from the Entertainment and Leisure Software Publishers Association (ELSPA), indicating sales of at least 300,000 copies in the United Kingdom.

See also
Sonic Gems Collection

Notes

References

External links

2002 video games
GameCube games
PlayStation 2 games
Sonic Team games
Sonic the Hedgehog video games
Sega video game compilations
Video games developed in Japan
Windows games
Xbox games
Multiplayer and single-player video games

fr:Compilations Sonic#Sonic Mega Collection